The Ateneo Blue Eagles are the collegiate varsity teams of the Ateneo de Manila University that play in the University Athletic Association of the Philippines (UAAP), the premiere collegiate league in the Philippines. The collegiate women's varsity basketball team is called the Lady Eagles. The Ateneo collegiate men's varsity basketball team was not always called the Blue Eagles. It got the name Blue Eagles when Ateneo adopted the Eagle as its mascot in 1938. Prior to that, from 1914 it was known under different names. Beginning with UAAP Season 84 in May 2022, Ateneo de Manila University officially decided to unify student athletes and varsity teams under the "Blue Eagles" moniker, regardless of sport, gender, or age group. Ateneo has fifteen collegiate men's varsity teams that participate in fifteen sporting events of the University Athletic Association of the Philippines, its mother league. Twenty five years after playing their last game as Blue Eagles, the Board of Directors of the Ateneo Sports Hall of Fame review their playing years as Blue Eagles. Those who meet the criteria are inducted into the Ateneo Sports Hall of Fame.

Team identity

Team monikers 
When Ateneo started to participate in intercollegiate sports in 1914, its varsity basketball teams were simply referred to by the school community as the Ateneo Seniors and Ateneo Juniors. They were later dubbed the Blue and Whites by the sports press in the early 1920s when Ateneo joined sports leagues. When Ateneo adopted the Eagle as its mascot in 1938, the college team was given a new name: Blue Eagles. The Ateneo Blue Eagles are sometimes called the Hail Mary Quintet by the sports press. This moniker was given to the Blue Eagles in 1926 when sports press noticed that the team would pray the Hail Mary (as the school’s patroness is the Immaculate Conception) during game time-outs and would win by the skin of their teeth.

Ateneo is one of the four UAAP member schools that participate in all of the fifteen sporting events of the University Athletic Association of the Philippines. Since the Eagle is the mascot of all the varsity teams participating in these sporting events all of them are called Blue Eagles. However, the Guidon which is the school's official student publications have given them specific names to differentiate them when news about their games are reported. They are as follows:

Mascot and colors 
Ateneo has long been involved in intercollegiate sports dating back to 1914. It was a pioneer in Philippine collegiate sports. Ateneo was the first Philippine school to adopt a mascot, and was also the first school to field an organized cheering squad with cheerleaders which was later followed by another first when it introduced a Pep Band to augment the cheerleaders during games.

The choice of an eagle as school mascot holds iconic significance. Conferred with the title "the King", the Blue Eagle is a reference to the "high-flying" Ateneo varsity teams which would "swoop down on the foe and sweep up the fields away" as a dominating force in the field of sports.  Furthermore, there is some mythological significance to the eagle as a symbol of power.

The school used to have live eagles as pets in the former Padre Faura campus and later on at the Grade School campus in Loyola Heights. A live eagle would lead the men's varsity basketball team at the start of a game in the NCAA as the team enters the basketball court for their warm-up with the school Band playing the fight song, "Blue Eagle – The King".

Blue and White, being the colors of the school's patroness, the Blessed Virgin Mary, were chosen as the school's colors. Thus blue and white are the colors of the uniforms of the varsity teams. Most of the school songs, yells and cheers have the words blue and white.

Athletic associations

Collegiate leagues 
The Ateneo de Manila University is a member of the University Athletic Association of the Philippines, the premiere sports league in the country. It fields teams in all fifteen sporting events of the league. Ateneo was a founding member of the National Collegiate Athletic Association, which was established in 1924. It left the NCAA in 1978 due to the league-wide violence prevalent at the time, and then joined the UAAP in the same year.

Other tournaments 
Aside from the UAAP, the Ateneo Blue Eagles also participates during the UAAP preseason in other sports leagues/tournaments such as the Fil-Oil Flying V Preseason Cup, SMART City Hoops Summer Classic, Breakdown Basketball Invitationals, Philippine Collegiate Championship League (PCCL), Premier Volleyball League, Rizal Football Association (RIFA).

Team sports

Basketball

Volleyball
The Ateneo Volleyball Program enjoyed a modest success in the NCAA, having won a total of nine championships during a ten-year period from 1967 to 1976. The men's team had two titles and one from the women's, while the juniors team had won six titles. Ateneo dominated NCAA volleyball in the mid-1970s. In the UAAP, Ateneo has won five championships so far since transferring from the NCAA in 1978. These titles were won by the Lady Eagle Spikers in Season 76 (2013–14) and Season 77 (2014–15) and by the Blue Eagle Spikers in Season 77 (2014–15), Season 78 (2015–16) and Season 79 (2016–17), finally ending a title drought of more than 30 years in UAAP volleyball.

Championships

Double Championships

UAAP Finals Appearances

The Ateneo Blue Eagles Volleyball Team 

The men's volleyball team were back-to-back champions in NCAA Seasons 51 and 52, and were 3-peat champions in UAAP Seasons 77 to 79. The Blue Eagles were also able to achieve a perfect season in the UAAP Season 79 men's volleyball tournament.

The Ateneo Lady Eagles Volleyball Team

Notable volleyball players

Men's Division 
 Marck Jesus P. Espejo
 Ish Polvorosa

Women's Division 
 Alyssa Valdez
 Bea De Leon
 Maddie Madayag
 Kat Tolentino
 Dennise Lazaro
 Jia Morado
 Amy Ahomiro
 Fille Cainglet
 Dzi Gervacio
 Gretchen Ho
 Jamenea Ferrer
 Deanna Wong
 Charo Soriano
 Pauline Gaston

Football 
The Ateneo varsity football teams have won a total 19 championships, 9 in the NCAA and 10 in the UAAP. In the NCAA, the seniors have won 6 titles. The Blue Booters were the first to win a football championship in the NCAA when they won the title on the maiden season of the NCAA in 1924. They also won their first back-to-back (1953 and 1954) championship in the NCAA. In the UAAP, the seniors (men) have won 8 titles. The Blue Booters were three-peat champions after winning in Seasons 2003–04, 2004–05 and 2005–06, a record that still holds today. Football was introduced in the UAAP Juniors Division as a demonstration sport in season 70 (2007–08) and declared a regular sport in season 72 (2009–10)

Football Championships

Blue Booters
NCAA Season (6)
 1924–25
 1941–42
 1951–52
 1953–54
 1954–55
 1967–68

Blue Booters
UAAP Season (8)
 1995–96
 1998–99
 2003–04
 2004–05
 2005–06
 2012–13
 2016–17
 2018–19

Lady Blue Booters
UAAP Season

Notable football players 
Men's Division
 Virgilio "Baby" Dalupan
 Luis "Moro" Lorenzo
 Edgardo "Ed" Ocampo
 Jarvey Gayoso

Baseball

Baseball Championships

Notable baseball players

Men's Division
 Ambrosio "Paddy" Padilla

Women's Division
 Laura Lehmann

Rankings 
This is Ateneo's ranking in the team sports in the UAAP since 1986, the year the UAAP became an eight member-school league:

Championships 
Overall/General Championships
Ateneo has not won a UAAP General Championship in the seniors division since joining the UAAP in 1978. Its best finish was a third place in Season 75 (2012–13) and Season 79 (2016–17).

Seniors:
NCAA (1) – 1968–69

3x3 Basketball Championships
Blue Eagles: (Tournaments from 2017–18 until 2018–19 were classified as a Demonstration Sport)
UAAP (1) – 2018–19

Basketball Championships
Blue Eagles:
NCAA (14) – 1928–29, 1931–32, 1932–33, 1933–34, 1937–38, 1941–42, 1953–54, 1954–55, 1957–58, 1958–59, 1961–62, 1969–70, 1975–76, 1976–77
UAAP (12) – 1987–88, 1988–89, 2002–03, 2008–09, 2009–10, 2010–11, 2011–12, 2012–13, 2017–18, 2018–19, 2019–20, 2022–23
Lady Eagles:
UAAP (2) – 2005–06, 2007–08

Baseball Championships
Blue Batters:
NCAA (2) – 1927–28, 1965–66
UAAP (4) – 2012–13, 2013–14, 2014–15, 2016–17

Football Championships
Blue Booters:
NCAA (6) – 1924–25, 1941–42, 1951–52, 1953–54, 1954–55, 1967–68
UAAP (8) – 1995–96, 1998–99, 2003–04, 2004–05, 2005–06, 2012–13, 2016–17, 2018–19

Volleyball Championships
Blue Spikers:
NCAA (2) – 1975–76, 1976–77
UAAP (3) – 2014–15, 2015–16, 2016–17
Lady Spikers:
NCAA (1) – 1976–77
UAAP (3) – 2013–14, 2014–15, 2018–19

Badminton Championships
Blue Shuttlers:
UAAP (6) – 1995–96, 1996–97, 2001–02, 2003–04, 2011–12, 2013–14
Lady Shuttlers:
UAAP (5) – 2003–04, 2012–13, 2013–14, 2018–19, 2019–20

Lawn Tennis Championships
Blue Netters:
NCAA (1) – 1939–40
UAAP (1) – 2000–01

Fencing Championships
Lady Fencers:
UAAP (2) – 2006–07, 2018–19

Swimming Championships
Blue Tankers:
UAAP (7) – 2012–13, 2014–15, 2015–16, 2016–17, 2017–18, 2018–19, 2019–20
Lady Tankers:
UAAP (6) – 2008–09, 2014–15, 2015–16, 2017–18, 2018–19, 2019–20

Judo Championships
Blue Judokas:
UAAP (8) – 1997–98, 2004–05, 2008–09, 2009–10, 2010–11, 2013–14, 2015–16, 2017–18

Athletics (track and field) Championships
Blue Tracksters: (Tournaments from 1925–26 until 1952–53 consisted of events in relay and track and field)
NCAA (9) – 1925–56 (relay), 1934–35 (relay), 1949–50 (T/F), 1960–61, 1965–66, 1966–67, 1967–68, 1968–69, 1969–70

Sports traditions 
The Ateneo has several traditions related to sports. Most of these traditions have been introduced by the American Jesuits after they took over the administration of Ateneo in 1912.

References 

Ateneo de Manila University
College sports teams in Metro Manila
Premier Volleyball League (Philippines)
Spikers' Turf
Shakey's V-League
University Athletic Association of the Philippines teams